An ear dagger is a relatively rare and exotic form of dagger that was used during the late Middle Ages and Renaissance. It is so named because the pommel of the dagger has a very distinctive shape, somewhat resembling a human ear. Ear daggers frequently have a single sharpened edge that ends in an acute point. 

It is thought that the ear dagger was introduced to Europe from Spain, where it presumably originated from the Moors.

History
The design (in bronze) may have appeared in the second millennium BC in Luristan and is more firmly attested in the first.  Further production in the same area took place between 300AD and 500AD. The design was first made in Europe in the Iberian peninsular. By the 15th century manufacturer had extended to Italy.

See also
Baselard
Bollock
Dagger
Dirk
Rondel
Stiletto
List of daggers

References

External links
myarmoury.com
myarmoury.com article on rondel daggers, with an illustration of an ear dagger
liveseycompany.com
Royal armouries collection, high resolution images of authentic example

Daggers